The following is a list of locomotives produced by the Electro-Motive Corporation (EMC), and its successors General Motors Electro-Motive Division (GM-EMD) and Electro-Motive Diesel (EMD).

Streamlined power cars and early experimental locomotives
EMC participated in the construction of a number of motorized railcars, integrated streamliner trainsets, and experimental locomotives in the 1930s. Most of these were short production runs (one, two, or four units) that were used by a single railroad. These consisted of Winton prime movers and General Electric generating, control, and transmission components inside a carbody whose assembly was subcontracted to another manufacturer, since EMC did not commence regular road locomotive production until 1937.

Switchers (SW/NW/SC/NC/MP)
The "S" designation originally stood for six hundred horsepower and the "N" designation for nine hundred horsepower, although they were used for the more general designation of smaller and larger engine models after the more powerful 567 model engines replaced the Winton engines. The "C" designation stood for cast frame locomotives and the "W" designation for welded frame locomotives. EMC standardized on welded frames after 1939. The "TR" designation stood for transfer locomotives.

The SC and SW switchers were the first locomotives produced in EMC's new factory after its completion in 1936. The pre-SC and Model 90 switchers were development design locomotives outshopped in 1935.

Passenger cab units (E)

Freight cab units (F)

Industrial locomotives

Military locomotives

Four-axle "Branch Line" series roadswitchers (BL)

Four-axle roadswitchers or General Purpose Locomotives (GP)

Six-axle roadswitchers or Special Duty Locomotives (SD)

Six-Axle Road Switcher Production Timeline

Eight-axle roadswitchers

Cowl units

Electric locomotives

Export and narrow gauge locomotives

Aftermarket conversions

References

Notes

Bibliography

External links

 The History of EMD Diesel Engines

!
GM-EMD locomotives
Articles which contain graphical timelines
!